Ricky Don Thompson (born May 15, 1954) is a former American football wide receiver in the National Football League (NFL) for the Baltimore Colts, the Washington Redskins, and the St. Louis Cardinals.  He played college football at Baylor University and was drafted in the eighth round of the 1976 NFL Draft.

Thompson was a member of the 1974 Southwest Conference (SWC) championship team at Baylor which is known in school lore as the "Miracle on the Brazos" team since the 1973 Baylor team had finished in last place and the 1974 team was picked last by many.  Thompson scored two of Baylor's three touchdowns in the 1975 Cotton Bowl Classic against Penn State.

Thompson is currently the football sideline reporter for the Baylor Radio Network.

Referees

1954 births
Living people
American football wide receivers
Baylor Bears football players
Baltimore Colts players
Washington Redskins players
St. Louis Cardinals (football) players
Players of American football from El Paso, Texas